Jardim Cinira is a neighborhood the city of Itapecerica da Serra, in the Brazilian state of São Paulo.

Currently has 11 streets; "Soldado PM Gilberto Augustinho Avenue", "Getúlio Vargas Avenue", "Deodoro da Fonseca Street", "Campos Sales Street", "Epitácio Pessoa Street", "Washington Luís Street", "Palmares Street", "Nova Granada Street", "Floriano Peixoto Street", "Palestina Street" and "Hermes da Fonseca Street".

The neighborhood is the most populous of Itapecerica da Serra, and the region, live councillors of Itapecerica da Serra in neighborhood, addition to another district as the Parque Paraíso, which is the largest district of city and has a school and a nursery.  Techo-South Rodoanel Mario Covas is being built in the neighborhood.  In the neighborhood is also famous lake in the region. The Lake of Cristalina, free and fair at all Friday.

The district generates much trade, and average urbanization.

See also

Parque Paraíso

Neighbourhoods in Itapecerica da Serra